Indonesia has submitted feature films for the Academy Award for Best International Feature Film since 1987. The award is given annually by the Academy of Motion Picture Arts and Sciences to a feature-length motion picture produced outside the United States that contains primarily non-English dialogue. It was created for the 1956 Academy Awards, in which a competitive Academy Award of Merit, known as the Best Foreign Language Film Award, was created for non-English speaking films, and has been given annually since.

, 23 Indonesian films have been successfully submitted for the Academy Award for Best Foreign Language Film, but none of them have been nominated for it. The country attempted to send a film in 1988, but the submission was disqualified for lacking English subtitles.

The two Indonesian directors to have multiple films submitted are Nia Dinata and Garin Nugroho. Dinata's Ca-bau-kan was Indonesia's submission for the 75th Academy Awards and her Love for Share was the official Indonesian submission to the 79th Academy Awards. Nugroho's Leaf on a Pillow was the country's submission for the 71st Academy Awards and his Memories of My Body was the official submission for the 92nd Academy Awards.

Submissions 
The Academy of Motion Picture Arts and Sciences has invited the film industries of various countries to submit their best film for the Academy Award for Best Foreign Language Film since 1956. The Foreign Language Film Award Committee oversees the process and reviews all the submitted films. Following this, they vote via secret ballot to determine the five nominees for the award. The Indonesian submissions are selected by Persatuan Produser Film Indonesia (English: Indonesian Motion Picture  Producers Association).

Below is a list of the films that have been submitted by Indonesia for review by the Academy for the award by year and the respective Academy Awards ceremony.

See also 
 List of Academy Award winners and nominees for Best Foreign Language Film
 List of Academy Award-winning foreign language films
 List of Indonesian films
 Cinema of Indonesia

Notes

References 
General

 

Specific

External links 
 The Official Academy Awards Database
 IMDb Academy Awards Page

Indonesia
 
Academy Award for Best Foreign Language Film, submissions